The men's college basketball program of the University of California, Los Angeles (UCLA) was founded in 1919 and is known competitively as the UCLA Bruins. The team has had 13 head coaches in its history, and they have won 11 National Collegiate Athletic Association (NCAA) Men's Division I Basketball Championships, the most of any  school. John Wooden won 10 national championships between 1964 and 1975, and  Jim Harrick won the other in 1995. The New York Times wrote that Wooden "made UCLA the most successful team in college basketball." After Wooden retired, the four coaches that succeeded him resigned, and the following three—Harrick included—were fired. The average tenure of those coaches after Wooden was four years. Ben Howland, led the Bruins to three consecutive Final Four appearances from 2006 to 2008.

Statistics updated through 2019–20 season

Notes

References

UCLA

Bruins basketball, men's, coaches
UCLA Bruins basketball, men's, coaches